Raboliot is a 1946 French drama film directed by Jacques Daroy and starring Julien Bertheau, René Blancard and Lise Delamare. It is based on the 1925 novel of the same title by Maurice Genevoix depicting the life of a poacher.

Cast
 Julien Bertheau as Pierre Fouques dit Raboliot  
 René Blancard as Le garde-chasse Bourrel  
 Lise Delamare as Flora  
 Blanchette Brunoy as Sandrine Fouques  
 Annie Hémery as Tavie 
 Paul Barré 
 Pierre Clarel as Sarrelotte  
 Jean d'Yd as Touraille  
 Marcel Delaître as Volat  
 Jean Francel 
 Georges Hubert as Un braconnier  
 Linette Lemercier as La gamine  
 Marthe Mellot 
 Albert Montigny 
 Robert Moor 
 Marcel Pérès as Un paysan  
 Alexandre Rignault as Firmin Tournafier  
 Jacques Roussel 
 Jean Rozenberg 
 Maurice Salabert
 Lucien Treffel
 Henri Valbel as Le régisseur Tancogne  
 Marco Villa

References

Bibliography 
 Goble, Alan. The Complete Index to Literary Sources in Film. Walter de Gruyter, 1999.

External links 
 

1946 films
French drama films
1946 drama films
1940s French-language films
Films directed by Jacques Daroy
Films based on French novels
Pathé films
French black-and-white films
1940s French films